Leslie Harold Collier (9 February 1921 – 14 March 2011) was a scientist responsible for developing a freeze-drying method to produce a more heat stable smallpox vaccine in the late 1940s. Collier added a key component, peptone, a soluble protein, to the process. This protected the virus, enabling the production of a heat-stable vaccine in powdered form. Previously, smallpox vaccines would become ineffective after 1–2 days at ambient temperature.

The development of his vaccine production method played a large role in enabling the World Health Organization to initiate its global smallpox eradication campaign in 1967.

Publications 

Collier was a co-editor of the eighth edition and editor-in-chief of the five-volume ninth edition of the "microbiologist’s bible", Topley and Wilson's Principles of Bacteriology and Immunity (now Topley and Wilson's Microbiology and Microbial Infections), which won the Society of Authors' 1998 award in the advanced edited book category.He was also joint editor of Developments in Antiviral Chemotherapy (1980).He was a co-author of Human Virology (1993).

References

External links 

 

1921 births
2011 deaths
Smallpox vaccines
British scientists
British virologists
People educated at Brighton College
Alumni of the UCL Medical School